Dušan Mugoša (  7 January 1914 – 8 August 1973), nicknamed Duć (Дућ), was a Yugoslav Partisan. He and Miladin Popović were the Yugoslav delegates that helped unite the Albanian communist groups in 1941. The two had been sent to Albania on the directive of the Central Committee of the Communist Party of Yugoslavia (CK KPJ), chosen for their revolutionary experience and political knowledge, to be available to the Albanian communists; they were the most active regarding Yugoslav–Albanian alliance. 

Mugoša and Popović were members of the Regional Committee KPJ (OK KPJ) of Kosmet (Kosovo and Metohija). In October 1941, OK KPJ Kosmet representatives Boro Vukmirović, Dušan Mugoša, Pavle Jovićević and Ali Shukriu met with Albanian communist delegation made up by Koço Tashko, Xhevdet Doda and Elhami Nimani in Vitomirica (in Kosovo). After having persuaded the disunited Albanian communists to pursue a common fight for "liberation from capitalistic exploitations and Imperial slavery", the work culminated in the meeting of 8 November 1941, with over twenty representatives, that ended in the official establishment of the Albanian Communist Party.

While in Tirana, after the freeing of Popović, Krsto Filipović and others from prison camps, the OK KPJ Kosmet decided that Mugoša and Popović stay in Albania. Boro Vukmirović requested that Mugoša be returned to Kosovo. On 25 May 1942, Mugoša began his trip crossing Montenegro, joining up with Todor Vojvodić and Spasoje Đaković in Andrijevica. As the secretary of OK KPJ of Kosmet, he announced the annexation of Kosovo and Metohija to Serbia. 

He left Albania on 12 April 1944. The three most influential in the decision of uniting Vojvodina and Kosovo and Metohija to NR Serbia were Jovan Veselinov, Dušan Mugoša, and Mehmed Hoxha, who represented the provinces on the extraordinary session of the Anti-Fascist Council of the National Liberation of Serbia on 6 April 1945.

References

Sources

20th-century Serbian people
Yugoslav Partisans members
Albania–Serbia relations
Montenegrin communists
1914 births
1973 deaths
Military personnel from Podgorica
Recipients of the Order of the People's Hero